Lydia Antonovna Ponomarenko (February 16, 1922,  Artiomovsk(fr) - December 3, 2013, Kyev) - Ukrainian local historian, historian of Kiev and Ukraine, researcher of historical topography and urban toponymy, co-author of an encyclopedic directory of Kiev street names.

Biography 
Lydia Antonovna Ponomarenko was born in the family of a miner at the Artyom mine. Ponomarenko graduated from a secondary school in Krasnodon in 1939 and graduated from the Moscow Institute of Engineers of Geodesy, Aerial Photography and Cartography (aerial photography geodetic engineer) in 1949. Ponomarenko worked in her specialty in Novoshakhtinsk, Kadievka.

Ponomarenko has lived and worked in Kyiv since 1959. As an employee of the laboratory of aerial methods of Kyiv University, Ponomarenko served in various institutions, dealing with geodesy and topography. In 1967-1970 when she was a researcher at the Institute of Scientific and Technical Information.

Since 1970, Ponomarenko has been professionally engaged in historical topography and cartography. Senior engineer-cartographer of the Institute of History of Ukraine at the Academy of Sciences of the Ukrainian SSR (1970–1982). She studied numerous plans and descriptions of Ukrainian cities of different eras, primarily Kyiv; among the materials considered by her, many were discovered and introduced into scientific circulation for the first time. Found in Leningrad a manuscript of the book "History of the City of Kyiv..." by Maxim Berlinsky, which was considered lost (now published).

Starting from the 1960s, Ponomarenko studied the toponymy of Kyiv, compiled an extensive card index on the history of city names. A number of finds were published by her in scientific publications and periodicals (over 300 publications in total, including in the newspapers Vechirniy Kiev, Khreschatyk, Janus-Nerukhomist). She handed over the materials of the card index and her works to Vernadsky National Library of Ukraine.

Participant of many scientific conferences. In the press, on radio and television programs, she actively advocated the preservation of historical toponymy, in defense of the cultural heritage of Kyiv and Ukraine; member of the Main Council of the Ukrainian Society for the Protection of Historical and Cultural Monuments. For a long time she headed the Kyiv section of monuments of science and technology; collaborated with the Center for Monument Studies of the National Academy of Sciences of Ukraine.

Since 1970, Ponomarenko was a member of the City Commission on Names and Memorable Signs, the initiator of the introduction and revival of a number of Kyiv toponyms. In the last years of her life Ponomarenko was an honorary member of the commission.

Author of materials on the toponymy of the city in the encyclopedic reference book "Kyiv" (reprinted several times in 1981–1986). Prepared (in co-authorship) a complete encyclopedic reference book of Kyiv street names (1995).

Died in Kyiv; the last months of her life she was bedridden due to a fracture of the hip joint due to an accident. She was buried in the cemetery of the village of Letki.

Family 
Her younger brother died at the front on the eve of the Victory (May 8, 1945).

Books and main publications 
Published works:

(Ponomarenko L. A., Riznyk O. O.) Kyiv: Short Toponymic Directory. — Kyiv, 2003. (Ukrainian)  , .
 (Ponomarenko L., Serenkov L.) Kyiv. History in geographical names. — Kyïv: Centr pamʺjatkoznavstva NAN Ukraïny i UTOPIK. 2007. (Ukrainian) ,  

References:
 Plans of the city of Kyiv of the XVII–XIX centuries. as a historical source // Kyivska starovyna. — 1972. — P.62–69. (Ukrainian)
 Topographical descriptions of Kyiv at the end of the 18th and the beginning of the 19th centuries. // Historical studies. Homeland history. — Issue 8. — Kyiv, 1982. — P.39–42. (Ukrainian)
 Geographical, topographical and other official descriptions of Kyiv in the second half of the 18th and early 19th centuries. // Kyiv in the funds of the Central Scientific Library of the Academy of Sciences of the Ukrainian SSR. — Kyiv: Naukova dumka, 1984. — P.62–83.
 Official descriptions of the provinces of the 18th and the first half of the 19th century // Manuscript and book heritage of Ukraine. — Issue 1. — Kyiv, 1993. — P.59–69. (Ukrainian)
 Streets of Kyiv: Handbook / Ed. A. V. Kudrytskyi / Ref. A. V. Kudrytskyi, L. A. Ponomarenko, O. O. Riznyk. — Kyiv: Ukrainian Encyclopedia, 1995. (Ukrainian)
 Portrait on the background of Kyiv. — Kyiv, 2002. (Articles, bibliography). 
 Lidia Antonivna Ponomarenko - historian, Kyiv expert, toponymist: Bio-bibliographic index. — Kyiv: 2012. (Ukrainian)
 Maps and plans in the source studies of Lydia Ponomarenko (with a description of the cartographic sources of the V.I. Vernadsky Manuscript Institute of the NBU and an appendix of information on maps and plans from the history of Ukraine in Russian archival and manuscript collections) / author: A.V. Pivovar – K .: Akademperiodika, 2012. – 668 p.

References 

2013 deaths
1922 births
Ukrainian historians
Ukrainian women historians
Cartographers by century
Cartographers by nationality
Cartographers by subject